Pristol is a commune in Mehedinți County, Oltenia, Romania. It is composed of two villages, Cozia and Pristol.

References

Communes in Mehedinți County
Localities in Oltenia